Finland is a country in Northern Europe.

Finland may also refer to:
Grand Duchy of Finland, predecessor state of the modern country, 1809–1917
Diocese of Finland, predecessor of diocese of Turku
Finland (European Parliament constituency)
Finland, Minnesota, unincorporated community in the United States
Finland, South Carolina, an unincorporated community in the United States
Finland, a settlement in New Sweden at the site of modern Marcus Hook, Pennsylvania
Suomi-Finland,a 1988 album by Finnish group Sielun Veljet
"Finland" (comedy song), a 1980 song by Monty Python, first released on Monty Python's Contractual Obligation Album
USS Finland (ID-4543), a World War I-era steamship
Little Finland, a scenic red rock area, located in a remote section of Clark County, Nevada
New Finland, Saskatchewan, a Finnish block settlement district in Canada
Nutty Finland (Pähkähullu Suomi), a 1967 Finnish comedy film by Spede Pasanen

See also
 :Category:National sports teams of Finland, teams playing as "Finland"
 :Category:Finland at the Olympics
 Finland Proper (disambiguation)
 Finlandia (disambiguation)
 Finnish (disambiguation)
 Suomi (disambiguation)